Psycholula is the first album from the rockabilly band Mad Heads. It was released in Germany and was very successful. The most famous song from this album was "Mad Heads Boogie".

This album has been released in Germany (1996) and in the Ukraine (2006).  Some of the tracks from it, "Mad Heads Boogie" and "" Twanging, Beating & Shouts" appeared on  Ukraine-released compilation albums Naykrascha Myt.

Track listing
"Never Die" - 1:59
" Evil People" - 4:00
" N.D.E." - 3:09
"The Nails" - 3:22
"Cheap Chick Baby" - 2:02
"I Wait" - 5:27
"Rockin' Brain" - 3:28
" Ghost" - 3:19
"Timid Guy" - 3:36
" Through The Night" - 3:38
" Mad Heads Boogie" - 2:38
" Twanging, Beating & Shouts" - 4:25
"  Elephants' Run" - 4:17
" Welcome" - 3:36

Video
Ghost by V.Yakimenko

Personnel
Vadym Krasnooky – vocal, guitar
Stas Lisovsky – doublebass
Bogdan Ocheretyany – backing vocals, drums

1996 albums
Mad Heads albums